Corey Albano (born July 28, 1975) is an American-Italian former professional basketball player.

College career
Albano grew up in Toms River, New Jersey played high school basketball at Toms River High School South, graduating in 1993. After high school, he played college basketball at the Monmouth University, where he was a member of the Monmouth Hawks men's basketball team, from 1993 until 1997.  In 1996, as a Junior, Albano led the Monmouth Hawks to the school's first ever division 1 NCAA tournament appearance, where after going 20–9 they earned a 13 seed. During that 95–96 season Albano was the team's leading scorer, averaging 17.2 points per game. The team has been back to the tournament 4 times since Albano led the Hawks there his Junior year.

Professional career
Albano played for Ginásio C.F. in Portugal, Scaligera Verona, Victoria Libertas Pesaro, S.S. Basket Napoli, Pallacanestro Varese and Gruppo Triboldi Basket in Italy, Panathinaikos and Olympias Patras in Greece and Saint-Quentin in France.

While playing with Panathinaikos he won the 2001–02 Euroleague championship.

References

External links
Corey Albano at basketball-reference.com
Corey Albano at euroleague.net

1975 births
Living people
American expatriate basketball people in France
American expatriate basketball people in Greece
American expatriate basketball people in Italy
American expatriate basketball people in Portugal
American men's basketball players
American people of Italian descent
Basketball players from New York City
Monmouth Hawks men's basketball players
Olympias Patras B.C. players
Pallacanestro Varese players
Panathinaikos B.C. players
Power forwards (basketball)
Scaligera Basket Verona players
Sportspeople from Toms River, New Jersey
Toms River High School South alumni
Victoria Libertas Pallacanestro players